US Airways operated a predominantly Airbus fleet, with some older Boeing aircraft and a small fleet of Embraer jets.

Final fleet

As of December 9, 2013, at the time of the merger, US Airways' fleet consisted of the following aircraft:

Fleet history
Retired aircraft flown by US Airways as well as by predecessors Allegheny Airlines, America West Airlines, Empire Airlines, Pacific Southwest Airlines and Piedmont Airlines included:

See also
US Airways livery

References

US Airways Group
Lists of aircraft by operator